Joseph Vardon (27 July 1843 – 20 July 1913) was an Australian politician. Born in Adelaide, he received a primary education before becoming a farm worker and apprentice printer, running his own printing business by 1871. He sat on Hindmarsh, Unley, and Adelaide City councils, and was President of the South Australian Liberal Union.

He was elected to the Legislative Council of South Australia for the Central District in May 1900, serving until October 1906. Vardon resigned to contest the federal election in December 1906 as an Anti-Socialist candidate for the three South Australian seats in the Australian Senate. At the first count he was in fourth place, 16 votes behind Dugald Crosby. A second count however put Vardon into third, 34 votes ahead of Crosby. Justice Barton, sitting as the Court of Disputed Returns, found that 185 votes had been invalidated because of errors by the returning officers which affected the outcome of the election and declared the election void on 31 May 1907. The South Australian Labor Government attempted to install James O'Loghlin in the vacancy. Vardon's initial attempts to obtain a fresh election were unsuccessful. Vardon subsequently succeeded with the High Court declaring O'Loghlin's appointment was void and ordering a supplementary election. Vardon and O'Loghlin both contested the election, with Vardon winning comfortably with 54% of the vote. He was defeated in the 1913 Election, by now a member of the Commonwealth Liberal Party.

His son, Edward Vardon, was an MP for Sturt 1918–1921, 1924–1930 and South Australian Nationalist Senator 1921–1923.

His daughter, Hilda Marian Vardon (1886–1959) married Horace Abercrombie Fairweather (1881–1969), brother of Andrew Fairweather, on 12 April 1911.

References

Australian printers
Free Trade Party members of the Parliament of Australia
Commonwealth Liberal Party members of the Parliament of Australia
Members of the Australian Senate for South Australia
Members of the Australian Senate
Members of the South Australian House of Assembly
1843 births
1913 deaths
20th-century Australian politicians